Belisario Agulla (born Buenos Aires, 23 May 1988) is an Argentine rugby union player. He plays as a wing and as a fullback.

Agulla played for Hindú Club, in Argentina, from 2009 to 2011, winning the Nacional de Clubes in 2010. He also played at the same time for Pampas XV in South African Vodacom Cup. He moved to SU Agen, in France, where he was for 2011-12 season. On 20 October 2015, Agulla moved to England to join Newcastle Falcons on the Aviva Premiership from the 2015-16 season.

Agulla has 11 caps for Argentina, since 2009, with 7 tries scored, 35 points on aggregate. He also has played for Argentina Jaguars.

References

External links
Belisario Agulla International Statistics

1988 births
Living people
Argentine rugby union players
Argentina international rugby union players
Hindú Club players
Pampas XV players
SU Agen Lot-et-Garonne players
Rugby union fullbacks
Newcastle Falcons players
Rugby union players from Buenos Aires